Litoria rivicola is a frog in the subfamily Pelodryadinae, endemic to Indonesia.  Scientists have observed this frog in Papua Province, about 750 meters above sea level.

References

Frogs of Asia
Amphibians described in 2005
rivicola